The 2001–02 ACB season was the 19th season of the Liga ACB.

Regular season

Playoffs

See also
 Liga ACB

External links
 ACB.com 
 linguasport.com 

Liga ACB seasons
 
Spain